Monika Skinder (born 19 November 2001) is a Polish cross-country skier. She competed at the 2022 Winter Olympics, in Women's 10 kilometre classical,  Women's sprint, and Women's 4 × 5 kilometre relay.

Life and career
She was born on 19 November 2001 in Tomaszów Lubelski, Lublin Voivodeship, Poland. She represents the MULKS Grupa Oscar Tomaszów Lubelski sports club.

On 5 January 2016, she made her debut start at an international-level FIS event in cross-country skiing in Štrbské Pleso, Slovakia, where she claimed second place. At the 2018 Junior World Championships, she won the silver medal in the sprint. She made her World Cup debut on 3 March 2017 in Lahti, she finished in 55th place in the sprint event.

In 2019, she won the gold medal in girls' sprint as well as the bronze medal in girls' 7.5 km classical at the 2019 European Youth Olympic Winter Festival in Sarajevo.

In 2021, she won the gold medal in the girls' sprint at the 2021 Nordic Junior World Ski Championships in Vuokatti, Finland.

Cross-country skiing results
All results are sourced from the International Ski Federation (FIS).

Olympic Games

World Championships

World Cup

Season standings

References

External links

2001 births
Living people
People from Tomaszów Lubelski
Polish female cross-country skiers
Cross-country skiers at the 2022 Winter Olympics
Olympic cross-country skiers of Poland